Saropogon is a genus of robber flies (insects in the family Asilidae). There are at least 120 described species in Saropogon.

See also
 List of Saropogon species

References

Further reading

External links

 

Asilidae genera
Articles created by Qbugbot